Bryan Jerome Gilbert Nouvier (born 21 June 1995) is a French professional footballer who plays as a midfielder.

Club career
In August 2015, Nouvier signed a three-year contract with Romanian side CFR Cluj.

Career statistics

Club

Honours

Club
CFR Cluj
Liga I: 2017–18
Cupa României: 2015–16

References

External links

1995 births
Living people
Footballers from Metz
French footballers
Association football midfielders
Championnat National 2 players
Championnat National 3 players
FC Metz players
Liga I players
CFR Cluj players
Sepsi OSK Sfântu Gheorghe players
Ekstraklasa players
Raków Częstochowa players
French expatriate footballers
Expatriate footballers in Romania
French expatriate sportspeople in Romania
Expatriate footballers in Poland
French expatriate sportspeople in Poland